The Ambassador Extraordinary and Plenipotentiary of the Russian Federation to Burkina Faso is the official representative of the President and the Government of the Russian Federation to the President and the Government of Burkina Faso.

The Russian ambassador to Burkina Faso is a non-resident ambassador, who holds the post of ambassador to Ivory Coast, where he and his staff work at large in the Embassy of Russia in Abidjan.

History of diplomatic relations

The formal establishment of diplomatic relations between the Soviet Union and what was then the Republic of Upper Volta were established on 18 February 1967. The country was renamed Burkina Faso on 4 August 1984. With the dissolution of the Soviet Union in 1991 the incumbent Soviet ambassador continued as representative of the Russian Federation until 1992, when the embassy in Ouagadougou was closed. With the closing of the embassy, relations were carried out through the Russian embassy in Abidjan, Ivory Coast, with the ambassador to Ivory Coast dually accredited to Burkina Faso.

List of representatives (1967 – present)

Representatives of the Soviet Union to the Republic of Upper Volta (1967 – 1984)

Representatives of the Soviet Union to Burkina Faso (1984 – 1991)

Representatives of the Russian Federation to Burkina Faso (1991 – present)

References

 
Burkina Faso
Russia